Han Yong-Su (born 5 May 1990) is a South Korean footballer who plays as a defender for Seoul E-Land FC in the K League 2.

External links 

1990 births
Living people
Association football defenders
South Korean footballers
Jeju United FC players
Gangwon FC players
Gwangju FC players
Chungnam Asan FC players
Seoul E-Land FC players
K League 1 players
K League 2 players
K3 League players
Hanyang University alumni